The Handsome Brute is a 1925 American drama film directed by Robert Eddy and written by Lillian Taft Maize. The film stars William Fairbanks, Virginia Lee Corbin, Lee Shumway, Robert Bolder, J.J. Bryson and Daniel Belmont. The film was released on December 1, 1925, by Columbia Pictures.

Cast        
William Fairbanks as Larry O'Day
Virginia Lee Corbin as Nelly Egan
Lee Shumway as John Granger
Robert Bolder as Thomas Egan
J.J. Bryson as Captain
Daniel Belmont as Watchman

References

External links
 

1925 films
American drama films
1925 drama films
Columbia Pictures films
American silent feature films
American black-and-white films
1925 comedy films
1920s English-language films
1920s American films
Silent American drama films